Space Cases is a Canadian science fiction television series that aired on Nickelodeon for two seasons. Created by Peter David and Bill Mumy, it premiered on March 2, 1996 and ended on January 27, 1997 with reruns until 1998. It aired for a time on Nickelodeon's Saturday night block of shows known as SNICK, and on Nickelodeon UK, with reruns on Family and TVOntario in Canada. An episode aired on TeenNick in the US as part of its The '90s Are All That block on the night of October 14, 2011 for the block's U Pick with Stick line-up, and again on December 27, 2011 for Party Like It's the '90s. Space Cases returned once again on the night of January 1, 2016 on TeenNick during the new The Splat programming block but has not aired since; the first four episodes of Season One were aired. The show's premise revolves around a group of misfit students and two adults who are stranded far from home aboard an alien ship. Their attempts at journeying back see many dangerous adventures and controversies, with some occasionally more mature themes.

The series was shot in Montreal, Quebec. Because of budget constraints, props from Are You Afraid of the Dark? and other Nickelodeon programs were used in the series. In other episodes, more mundane props were used, as in the episode "Homeward Bound", the character Suzee is sitting in a chair with compact discs pasted to either side. During the first season, electronic games such as Lights Out, were used as control panels on walls.

Season One's original theme song was orchestra-based, with an announcer voiceover giving a preamble. A vocal song telling the story of the Space Cases was used as the closing. For Season Two, this song was moved to the front and re-recorded to accommodate the removal of Catalina, the addition of Suzee, and some re-arranging to how the characters were presented. At some point after the series ended, Nickelodeon had the song re-recorded once more, using the same character arrangement as Season Two, but removing Suzee and adding Catalina back in, and created a new opening for the Season One episodes with this song.

The series features a multitude of celebrity guest stars throughout its run, including George Takei, Mark Hamill, Bill Mumy, Katey Sagal, Michelle Trachtenberg, Danny Tamberelli and Robin Leach.

Characters

Theresa James "T.J." Davenport (Cary Lawrence) is the children's vice principal, but serves as their teacher aboard the Christa. Davenport takes herself and the rest of the universe a little too seriously. She has a habit of fainting at the first sign of danger, but on several occasions has stood strong in the face of terrible danger, even though she ends up bluffing some of the time. In one episode, she becomes curious of Thelma's activities, and accidentally downloads herself, literally, into the ship's computers; her mood swings caused problems with the navigation until she was rescued.
Commander Seth Goddard (Paul Boretski) is a former Stardog, and fought in the Spung War. Busted in rank from Captain and forced to teach the "Space Cases," Goddard is tough enough to whip the kids into shape, though his rigidity sometimes entices the kids to provoke him and Miss Davenport with practical jokes. He has a long and bitter rivalry with a space pirate named Reaver. It is revealed in the second-season episode "Long Distance Calls" that Goddard was busted in rank for "almost starting a war" with Reaver. Goddard's backstory is one of the least explained in the series, and Reaver's appearance in the episode (whose entrance into the plot is explained by the creation of a communications device that the Christa's crew has possession of and Reaver wants to steal) raises more questions than answers. For example, Reaver can hold his own in a fight against Radu, who is Andromedan and allegedly has the strength of ten Earth men. Reaver even, for a time, 'psychically' combats Suzee who, up to this point in the series, never had problems pitching her consciousness into another entity to control them.
Harlan Band (Walter Emanuel Jones) is a human from Earth, and is attending the Academy to become a Stardog like his biological father, who was killed by an Andromedan during the Andromedan War. Because of this, he is often antagonistic and prejudiced against Radu, at least during Season One. Harlan is headstrong and the self-appointed leader of the students, acting as pilot on the bridge. However, he is extremely overconfident, which sometimes leads to his endangering the crew. Harlan displays advanced martial arts and gymnastics skills. Jones is also credited as stunt coordinator in an episode of Space Cases.
Catalina (Jewel Staite) is a rainbow-haired female ship's engineer from Titan, a moon of Saturn. Saturnians possess evolved vocal patterns, giving them and Catalina the ability to release destructive sonic screams. Though hers have disabled missiles, floored large attackers and assaulted the ship and all its contents, Catalina considers her powers to be "nothing" compared to the really skilled Saturnians who are known to shatter buildings with a single sonic blast. Catalina is often heard using the term "grozit" which appears to be a Saturnian non-vulgar expletive, similar in usage to the word "Heavens," in context such as "Heavens, no/grozit, no." Series co-creator Peter David has used the curse "grozit" in his Star Trek: New Frontier novels and Captain Marvel comics.  Initially, Catalina carries on conversations with Suzee, a person whom she explains is an invisible friend that no one else can see, but her crewmates initially believe Suzee to be an imaginary friend, despite Catalina's insistence to the contrary. In the Season 1 finale, "On the Road to Find Out", Suzee is explicitly revealed to be a real person, played by Rebecca Herbst. It is explained that Suzee existed in another dimension, on a planet called Yensid. In Season One, Catalina explains that their brainwaves are attuned to the same sonic frequency, allowing them to speak and even see each other as though they are in the same room (Catalina even turns to face Suzee as she talks to her). Catalina even tells the others that she can see Suzee, but no one else can. In Season Two, when Suzee and Catalina trade places, Catalina lives at Suzee's home and is not present on the ship in the same manner that Suzee seemed to be during Season One. During the second season, Suzee explains that something blocks off her ability to communicate with Catalina interdimensionally, which may have something to do with the reason why Suzee cannot see Catalina the same way Catalina saw Suzee in Season One. Staite would again play a young engineer on a spaceship years later as Kaylee Frye in the cult  television series Firefly.
Radu (Kristian Ayre) is a being from a planet called Andromeda (most people assume this to mean that he is from the Andromeda Galaxy). He has no real family, since Andromedans are hatched from eggs. Radu has super-sensitive hearing and superhuman strength, just as all Andromedans do, which was the reason behind the Spungs enslaving them and starting the Andromedan War. Radu suffers from an inferiority complex; as such, he tries his very hardest to get people to like him. The Andromedan culture is based on uniformity of mind and purpose, making Radu's desire to have a family and be his own person an anomaly of character. Radu has an appreciable sense of direction, which makes him the best candidate for the ship's navigator, forcing him to work in conjunction with the pilot, rival Harlan Band. Andromedans not only possess an internal temperature, but an internal barometric pressure as well. For this reason, when ill, snow may exude from an Andromedan's ears. Radu has a significantly greater molecular density than most humanoids, which accounts for his superior strength, and long hair, which is nearly impossible to cut. In the episode "Desperately Seeking Suzee," when the Christa is knocked around, and the entire crew is thrust, Radu who stands comfortably still with his arms crossed. He is also more patient, logical and realistic than the rest of the crew, especially Harlan.
Bova (Rahi Azizi) is from Uranus. Members of his race have a small, pronged antenna growing from their forehead which can generate powerful blasts of electricity. Bova has an incredible metabolism that supplements his advanced energy production, which is the reason for his incredible appetite. He will eat nearly anything, and is always hungry. Being from Uranus, and thereby "the butt of every joke," he is consistently pessimistic in every situation, a Uranian cultural trait. Bova is responsible for operating and monitoring the Christa's shields. The nature of Bova's name is never explained, but in the Season Two episode "Long Distance Calls," when Bova's father, Benn, calls to speak to his son. This is a reference to science fiction writer Ben Bova.
Rosie Ianni (Paige Christina) is from Mercury, and has the ability to produce vast amounts of heat at will. At the beginning of the series, she wears a helmet to help her control this ability, but it falls into disuse in subsequent episodes, revealing her naturally bald head, a trait of Mercurians. Because Mercury is so close to the Sun, all Mercurians have a tendency to "look on the bright side" of things, and as a result, Rosie is the mothering influence within the crew, always trying to make sure that her fellow cadets are happy and getting along. She serves as a doctor/scientist as well as acting as the communications officer on the bridge. She has a tendency to adopt seemingly cute things that turn out to be troublesome for the crew. At one point in the series, Rosie temporarily took on the power to generate telekinetic energy blasts.
Thelma (Techno Human EmuLating MAchine) (Anik Matern), the mysterious ship's only native inhabitant, is an android who often malfunctions, owing in no small part to the fact that her memory chip, a small gem residing in her forehead, is cracked. (It is unclear whether the crystal was cracked when Harlan stepped on it, or if the damage was preexisting.) She has a habit of taking things too literally, and often does not realize moderately obvious things. In season 2, her appearance changes to reflect the altered appearance of the Christa following the emergency crash on a planet. Her color changes from copper to silver and her gem changes from amber to sapphire.
Suzee (Rebecca Herbst) is Catalina's best friend, and is believed to be imaginary by the crew throughout Season One. Following Catalina's apparent death at the end of Season One, Suzee joins the crew in her stead. Suzee's hair is similar to Catalina's, but is longer and actually shows up as colored streaks interspersed through her predominantly brunette hair. She is very intelligent (she is said to be "smarter than a million books" in the revised opening title sequence that includes her character) and has two sets of gills just beneath both sides of her clavicle that allow her to breathe in any atmosphere, though not in the vacuum of space. A bit overconfident herself, and sometimes at odds with Miss Davenport for being treated like a child despite not officially being one of her students, Suzee is also a telepath who can read others' minds and project her consciousness into other people's minds in order to possess their bodies. This ability even extends to sentient computers, such as Pezu in the series finale "A Friend in Need". Suzee often acts as a rival to Harlan.  Rosie once accidentally blurts out that Suzee is attracted to Radu.
Elmira (Katie Emme McIninch) is a frequent ally of the Christa crew. She is a Spung oracle and as such, the crew did not trust her at first (especially Radu). Due to Spung society having a low opinion of their women, Elmira ran away from home years ago. Despite her upbringing, she is quite gentle and pleasant, if rather secretive. Although Radu at first despises her for her origins, the two grow close and kiss twice. It is revealed in the Season One finale that she is Warlord Shank's daughter. She gives the first foreshadowing of Catalina's later "death" when she predicts that someone new will come and Catalina will disappear.
Warlord Shank (George Takei), is a Spung commander who is a deadly space pirate and adversary for the crew of the Christa, having elite Spung officers under his command. He first appears in his Killcruiser when he intercepts and threatens to destroy the Christa after discovering that his daughter Elmira, a Spung princess and love interest of Radu, could be on board. Shank develops into a major villain throughout the run of the series.

Additional cast
 Mark Hamill as Pel
 Bill Mumy as Jin
 Serge Houde as Neinstein
 Daisy Eagan as Sofiana Mrtz
 Mark Camacho as Warden Opus
 Jim Bradford as Dram
 Zachary Ouimet as Kirge
 Peter David as Benn
 Chip Chiupka as Reaver
 Alexander Chapman as Ubi
 Robin Leach as Utz
 David Schramm as Yee Haw Jones
 Marcel Jeannin as Jesse
 Ted Jessup as Gunter Ianni

Synopsis
In the first episode of the series, a small group of misfits are kept behind from a Space Academy field trip. Nearby, an odd bird-like alien ship appears, and Harlan Band decides to sneak onto it; the other students, all of whom are younger and much less troublesome, follow Harlan onto the ship. During their exploration of the ship's interior, the organic ship bonds to each student when each touches a bulkhead.

TJ Davenport, their teacher and principal, and Commander Seth Goddard go after them and, in a series of unfortunate events, become separated throughout the vessel. One of the students accidentally charges the engines, hurtling the ship off into a spatial rift. By the time everyone figures out that only the children who bonded to the ship can actually control it, the ship has stopped several light years away from the Academy. They set off on a return trip which would take them at least seven years, four months, and twenty-two days at maximum speeds.

Episodes

Pilot

Season 1 (1996)

Season 2 (1996–97)

See also
 Star Trek: Prodigy - an animated series set in the Star Trek universe which uses a similar premise.

References

External links
 
 

1990s Canadian science fiction television series
1990s Nickelodeon original programming
1996 Canadian television series debuts
1997 Canadian television series endings
Canadian children's science fiction television series
English-language television shows
Space adventure television series
Television series about teenagers
Television series by Cookie Jar Entertainment
Television shows filmed in Montreal
Works by Peter David